Abdur Rahman (22 July 1946 – 22 November 2022) is a Bangladeshi make-up artist. He received National Film Award for Best Make-up Artist twice for the films Nekabborer Mohaproyan (2014) and  Moner Manush (2010). He worked in over 300 films.

Early life and career
Rahman was born in 1946 in Assam. After India partition his family moved to East Bengal.

Rahman made his debut in Dhallywood with Mintu Amar Nam. He was conferred National Film Award for Best Make-up Artist in 2010 for working in Moner Manush. Later, in 2014 he won National Film Award for Best Make-up Artist for Nekabborer Mohaproyan.

Rahman suffered a stroke in 2016. Later, he lost his ability to work. He was granted  BDT 5,00,000 on 14 September 2019 from Bangladeshi Prime Minister Sheikh Hasina for his medical expenses.

Selected filmography
 Mintu Amar Nam
 Moner Manush
 Nekabborer Mohaproyan
 Bhuban Majhi

References

External links
 

1946 births
2022 deaths
People from Assam
Bangladeshi make-up artists
Best Makeup National Film Award (Bangladesh) winners